James Simms may refer to:

 James Simms (instrument maker) (1828–1915), British instrument maker
 James Simms (Newfoundland official) (1779–1863), lawyer and merchant in Newfoundland
 James M. Simms (1823–?), African-American minister, newspaper publisher and member of the Georgia Assembly
 James P. Simms (1837–1887), Confederate States Army general and member of the Georgia legislature